The Frederick Torgler Building is a building located in north Portland, Oregon listed on the National Register of Historic Places.

See also
 National Register of Historic Places listings in North Portland, Oregon

References

External links
 

1894 establishments in Oregon
Commercial buildings completed in 1894
Commercial buildings on the National Register of Historic Places in Oregon
Buildings designated early commercial in the National Register of Historic Places
National Register of Historic Places in Portland, Oregon
North Portland, Oregon
Eliot, Portland, Oregon
Portland Historic Landmarks